Sean Daniel Flatley (born December 4, 1988 in Virginia Beach, Virginia) is an American soccer player.

Career

College
Flatley played his first two years of college soccer at the University of Maryland before transferring to the College of Charleston prior to his junior year in 2009. While with Charleston, Flatley made 20 appearances and scored three goals in his junior season and was named SoCon All-Conference First Team.  In his senior season, he made 19 appearances and scored four goals.

Professional
On April 11, 2011, Flatley signed his first professional contract with USL Pro club Charleston Battery. He made his professional debut on May 24 in a 2–1 win over the Richmond Kickers.

References

External links
 Maryland Terrapins bio
 College of Charleston bio

1988 births
Living people
American soccer players
Maryland Terrapins men's soccer players
College of Charleston Cougars men's soccer players
Charleston Battery players
Sportspeople from Virginia Beach, Virginia
Soccer players from Virginia Beach
USL Championship players
Association football defenders